Felicjan Kępiński (29 April 1885, in Piotrków Trybunalski, Poland – 8 April 1966, in Warsaw) was a Polish astronomer.

Work 

In 1903 he graduated from the government secondary school in Piotrków Trybunalski, later the 1st Bolesław Chrobry General Secondary School. In 1905 he took part in a students’ strike. As part of this boycott of Russian universities, he chose to study abroad. He first studied philosophy at the University of Leipzig (1905-1906), then mathematics and astronomy at the University of Göttingen (1906-1909) and the University of Berlin (1909-1912). In March 1913 he received his doctorate in philosophy. 

During the First World War he worked at the Berlin-Babelsberg astronomical observatory. In 1918, after Poland regained its independence, he moved to Warsaw. He later became assistant professor at the Astronomical Observatory of the University of Warsaw. He remained in this position until 1927. In 1925 he received his postdoctoral degree at the University of Vilnius. In 1927 he became a professor at the Warsaw University of Technology, where he founded the astronomical observatory, and also acted as its director from 1925 to 1955. 

In 1921, he initiated the publication of the Astronomical Yearbook, of which he was an editor for many years. 

Felicjan Kepiński was engaged in long-term research on the movement of the comet 22P/Kopffa, and on later used this research as the basis for his papers on the mechanics of heaven. In his work he dealt with issues concerning geodetic astronomy. 

In 1979, the International Astronomical Union named the Kępiński crater on the moon after Felicjan Kępiński.

20th-century Polish astronomers
1885 births
1966 deaths
People from Piotrków Trybunalski